The Los Alamitos Futurity is a Grade II American Thoroughbred horse race for two-year-olds run over a distance of one and one sixteenth miles ( furlongs) on the dirt held annually in early December at Los Alamitos Race Course in Cypress, California. The event currently offers a purse of $300,000.

History

The inaugural running of the event was on 29 November 1981 as the Hollywood Futurity and was won by Stalwart whose $365,805 winner's share was one of the largest in the history of American racing.

The event was upgrade to the highest classification of Grade I event in 1983. That year, the race had a total purse of $1,049,725, making it the first million-dollar race for two-year-olds and the richest Thoroughbred horse race at the time.

Between 1985 and 1990 the event was run at a shorter distance of one mile.

With his win in 1987, Tejano became the first two-year-old to achieve career earnings of $1 million.

The 1989 winner Grand Canyon won his fourth straight event and was undefeated winning by  lengths in a fastest time ever set by a two-year-old of 1:33 flat.

In 2006 the event was run on a new synthetic Cushion Track which was installed at Hollywood Park.

In 2007 the race name was changed to the CashCall Futurity under a sponsorship arrangement with the racing stable owner and founder of the CashCall consumer lending company, J. Paul Reddam.  Reddam's Slow Down Andy won the 2021 edition of the event. 

With the closure of Hollywood Park Racetrack in late 2013 the event was moved to the Los Alamitos Race Course and renamed to the Los Alamitos Futurity and held on the dirt track. The winner of the event in 2014 the 3/5 odds-on favorite Dortmund broke the Los Alamitos track record for the  miles distance. 

In 2019 the event was downgraded by the American Graded Stakes Committee to Grade II status.

Six Futurity starters have gone on to win the Kentucky Derby: Gato Del Sol (1982), Ferdinand (1986), Alysheba (1987), Thunder Gulch (1995), Real Quiet (1998), and Giacomo (2005). Preakness winners include Snow Chief (1986), Lookin at Lucky (2010), and Belmont winner A. P. Indy (1992). Real Quiet won the Derby and Preakness and Point Given won the 2001 Preakness & Belmont. Oxbow, who was fourth in the 2012 Futurity, won the Preakness.

Colts that won this event and went on to take US Champion Two-Year-Old Male Horse honors include Roving Boy (1982), Declan's Moon (2004) and Shared Belief (2013). 

Colts that won this event and went later in their careers to take awards include Snow Chief, 1986 US Champion Three-Year-Old Male Horse, A. P. Indy, 1992 US Champion Three-Year-Old Male Horse and US Horse of the Year, Real Quiet, 1999 US Champion Three-Year-Old Male Horse, Point Given, 2001 US Champion Three-Year-Old Male Horse, Lookin at Lucky, 2010 US Champion Three-Year-Old Male Horse. Alysheba finished second to Temperate Sil by a neck in the 1986 Hollywood Futurity but the following year after a sensational season was also honored with US Champion Three-Year-Old Male Horse honors and in 1988 was US Champion Older Dirt Male Horse and US Horse of the Year. 

2018 winner Improbable captured US Champion Older Dirt Male Horse honors in 2020. In 1985 Ferdinand finished 3rd to Snow Chief in the event. After an outstanding season as a four-year-old, Ferdinand was voted US Horse of the Year.

US Hall of Fame trainer Bob Baffert has saddled 13 winners in this event which includes seven winners in row between 2014 and 2020.

Records
Speed  records:
 miles (dirt): 1:40.74 – Afternoon Deelites (1994)  
 miles (synthetic): 1:40.82  – Into Mischief (2007) 
1 mile: 1:33.00 – Grand Canyon (1989) Margins: lengths – Mastery (2017)
7 lengths - Matty G (1995)Most wins by a jockey: 4 – Alex Solis (1985, 1995, 1996, 2005)
 4 – Laffit Pincay Jr. (1987, 1992, 1993, 1998)Most wins by a trainer: 13 – Bob Baffert (1997, 1999, 2000, 2008, 2009, 2011, 2014, 2015, 2016, 2017, 2018, 2019, 2020)Most wins by an owner: 4 – Michael E. Pegram (1997, 1999, 2009, 2017)

WinnersLegend: 
 Notes:'''

§ Ran as an entry

† In the 2017 running of the event Solomini finished was first past the finishing line but was disqualified and placed third for interference in the deep stretch drive and placed third. McKinzie was declared the winner and Instilled Regard placed second.

See also
List of American and Canadian Graded races
Road to the Kentucky Derby

References

Horse races in California
Los Alamitos, California
Flat horse races for two-year-olds
Grade 2 stakes races in the United States
Graded stakes races in the United States
1981 establishments in California